Ivan Dodig was the defending champion but chose not to defend his title.

Norbert Gombos won the title after defeating Yannik Reuter 7–5, 6–2 in the final.

Seeds

Draw

Finals

Top half

Bottom half

References
Main Draw
Qualifying Draw

Brest Challenger - Singles